St. Albans is the county seat of Franklin County, Vermont, United States. At the 2020 census, the city population was 6,877. St. Albans City is surrounded by the town of Saint Albans which is incorporated separately from the city of St. Albans. The city is located in Northwestern Vermont in Franklin County. It lies 29 miles north of Burlington, the state's most populous city which is located in Chittenden County.

History

One of the New Hampshire grants, St. Albans was chartered by Colonial Governor Benning Wentworth on August 17, 1763, to Stephen Pomeroy and 63 others. Named after St Albans, Hertfordshire, England, it was first settled during the Revolution by Jesse Welden. The war delayed further settlement until 1785, when many others began to arrive. Farmers found the rich, dark loam suitable for cultivation, as well as for the raising of cattle, horses and sheep. Butter and cheese were produced in great quantities. St. Albans also became known as "Railroad City," home to a major depot, operations center and repair shop of the Vermont and Canada Railroad. When the village was incorporated in 1859, it had an iron foundry, a manufacturer of freight cars, and a large number of mechanic shops.

The northernmost engagement of the Civil War, known as the St. Albans Raid, occurred here on October 19, 1864. In 1902, the City of St. Albans was incorporated, comprising two square miles (518 hectares) within the town of St. Albans. Today it is a tourist destination noted for its Victorian and Craftsman style architecture built during the railroad era, when over 200 trains a day passed through. St. Albans is a research focus for genealogists, as European immigrants heading for the United States would sometimes land in Canada at Halifax, Nova Scotia or Montreal, Quebec, then take a train through the border crossing here. The National Archives (NARA) lists for St. Albans cover the period 1895–1954.

Culture
In late April St. Albans hosts the annual Vermont Maple Festival. The festival includes various food-related contests, as well as the Sap Run, a footrace from Swanton,  to the north. It was home to the Vermont Voltage, a semi-professional men's soccer team, which folded in 2014.

Geography
According to the United States Census Bureau, the city has a total area of 2.0 square miles (5.3 km2), all land. The city is surrounded by the town of St. Albans, with its lush farmland across gently rolling hills. The city is drained by Stevens Brook.

St. Albans is crossed by Interstate 89, U.S. Route 7, as well as Vermont Route 36, 38, 104 and 105.

Demographics

At the 2020 census, the racial makeup was 91.1% White, 1.2% Black, 1.3%  Native American, 0.0% Asian and 1.9% Latino of any race.

At the 2010 census, there were 6,918 people. In the 2000 census there were 7,650 people, 3,235 households and 1,937 families residing in the city. The population density was 3,768.2 per square mile (1,455.0/km2). There were 3,376 housing units at an average density of 1,662.9 per square mile (642.1/km2). The racial makeup of the city was 95.87% White, 0.39% Black or African American, 1.20% Native American, 0.35% Asian, 0.03% Pacific Islander, 0.45% from other races, and 1.70% from two or more races. 0.90% of the population were Hispanic or Latino of any race.

There were 3,235 households, of which 31.6% had children under the age of 18 living with them, 43.6% were married couples living together, 12.1% had a female householder with no husband present, and 40.1% were non-families. 31.4% of all households were made up of individuals, and 12.6% had someone living alone who was 65 years of age or older. The average household size was 2.35 and the average family size was 2.97.

Age distribution was 25.6% under the age of 18, 8.3% from 18 to 24, 31.8% from 25 to 44, 20.3% from 45 to 64, and 14.0% who were 65 years of age or older. The median age was 35 years. For every 100 females, there were 91.6 males. For every 100 females age 18 and over, there were 86.2 males.

Government

St. Albans is governed via a mayor, a city manager and city council. The city council consists of six members, each elected from an individual ward. The mayor is elected by citywide vote.

Economy

Personal income
In the 2010 census, the median household income was $37,221, and the median family income was $44,286. Males had a median income of $31,340 versus $23,262 for females. The city's per capita income was $17,853. About 8.5% of families and 9.6% of the population were below the poverty line, including 9.2% of those under age 18 and 11.9% of those age 65 or over.

Industry
The town's comprehensive annual financial report for the fiscal year that ended June 30, 2020, lists the principal employers in the town as U.S. Department of Homeland Security's U.S. Citizenship and Immigration Services (USCIS) (650 employees), Northwestern Medical Center (612 employees), Maple Run Unified School District (608 employees), Mylan Technologies Inc. (425 employees), Dairy Farmers of America (95 employees), Sticks & Stuff (92 employees), the City of St. Albans (91 employees), A.N. Deringer, Inc. (80 employees), Peoples Trust Company (47 employees), and SB Collins (40 employees).

The USCIS has a service center in St. Albans; the majority of the 1,100 USCIS employees in Vermont are based in St. Albans, and the federal agency is the city's largest employer. The Dairy Farmers of America, a major dairy cooperative, has a manufacturing plant in St. Albans that produces cream, condensed skim milk, and milk powder. The chocolate and cocoa supplier Barry Callebaut has a facility in the city.

Infrastructure

Health care
The Northwestern Medical Center is a hospital serving the city and the Franklin County area.

Railways

Saint Albans is the northern terminus of the Vermonter, a coach/business class train operated by Amtrak, the national passenger rail system. The train operates daily between Saint Albans and Washington, D.C.

The train formerly continued from Saint Albans to Montreal and was named the Montrealer, but that connection was discontinued.

Education
St. Albans is home to St. Albans City School, an elementary school for students in kindergarten through eighth grade, and Bellows Free Academy, St. Albans, a public high school serving students from many towns in the southern half of Franklin Country.

Notable people

See also

 Champ (legend)
 St. Albans (Amtrak station)
 St. Albans raid
 Vermont Voltage (USL soccer team)

References

External links
 City of St. Albans, Vermont
 Saint Albans Museum

 
Saint Albans
 
Burlington, Vermont metropolitan area
County seats in Vermont
Saint Albans